Princess Auguste of Bavaria (28 April 1875 – 25 June 1964) was a member of the Bavarian Royal House of Wittelsbach and the spouse of Archduke Joseph August of Austria.

Birth and family
Auguste was born in Munich, Bavaria, the second child of Prince Leopold of Bavaria and his wife, Archduchess Gisela of Austria. She had one older sister, Princess Elisabeth Marie of Bavaria and two younger brothers, Prince Georg of Bavaria and Prince Konrad of Bavaria.

Marriage and issue
She married Joseph August, Archduke of Austria, on 15 November 1893 in Munich. The couple had six children;

 Archduke Joseph Francis of Austria, born on 28 March 1895; died on 
 Archduchess Gisela Auguste Anna Maria, born on 5 July 1897; died on 
 Archduchess Sophie Klementine Elisabeth Klothilde Maria, born on 11 March 1899; died on 
 Archduke Ladislaus Luitpold, born on 3 January 1901; died on 
 Archduke Matthias Joseph Albrecht Anton Ignatius, born on 26 June 1904; died on 
 Archduchess Magdalena Maria Raineria, born on 6 September 1909; died on

Ancestry

World War I
On the outbreak of war with Italy in 1915, Augusta Maria Louise, though in her 40s and the mother of a son serving as an officer, went to the front with the cavalry regiment of which her husband, the Archduke Josef August, a corps commander, was honorary colonel, and served a common soldier, wearing a saber and riding astride, until the end of the war.

References

 Die Wittelsbacher. Geschichte unserer Familie. Adalbert, Prinz von Bayern. Prestel Verlag, München, 1979

1875 births
1964 deaths
Nobility from Munich
German Roman Catholics
House of Wittelsbach
House of Habsburg-Lorraine
Bavarian princesses
Austrian princesses
Burials at Palatinal Crypt